Zachary Merton, born Zachary Moses (1843–1915), was an Anglo-German industrialist and philanthropist.

Biography
Merton's family had founded Metallgesellschaft in Germany and Henry R. Merton and Co. in Britain, which were among the leading metal trading companies of their respective countries. Merton was a director and one of the largest shareholders of the British company.

Merton's wife, Antonie, had come to England from Germany with her previous husband, Hermann Schmiechen, a portrait painter. She was a follower of theosophy. Merton and Antonie lived at Folly Farm, Sulhamstead.

Merton died in 1915 but left £350,000 in his will to establish a series of convalescent homes. These included:

the Zachary Merton Convalescent Home in Banstead, Surrey
the Zachary Merton Convalescent Home in Bearsden, East Dunbartonshire
the Zachary Merton Convalescent Home in Fulwood, South Yorkshire
the Zachary Merton Convalescent Home in Grayshott, Hampshire
the Zachary Merton Convalescent Home in Northwood, Middlesex
the Zachary Merton Convalescent Home in Pendlebury, Greater Manchester
the Zachary Merton Convalescent Home in Rustington, West Sussex
the Zachary Merton Convalescent Home in Woodhouse Eaves, Leicestershire

References

1843 births
1915 deaths
19th-century German Jews
Businesspeople from Frankfurt
Businesspeople in metals